Peter Rund (born 21 February 1943) is a retired German water polo player and swimmer. He competed at the 1968 Summer Olympics, and finished in sixth place with the East German team, contributing 13 goals in 9 matches. He also competed in swimming at the national level, winning the East German championships in the 4×100 m freestyle relay in 1970.

He married Evelyn Stolze, a German Olympic swimmer; their daughter Cathleen Rund also became an Olympic swimmer.

References

1943 births
Living people
German male water polo players
Olympic water polo players of East Germany
Water polo players at the 1968 Summer Olympics